Ivano Zanatta (born 3 August 1960) is an Italian ice hockey coach and former player. He competed in the men's tournament at the 1992 Winter Olympics. He currently serves as the head coach to HC Kunlun Red Star of the Kontinental Hockey League (KHL) and also the Chinese national team.

References

External links
 

1960 births
Living people
Olympic ice hockey players of Italy
Ice hockey players at the 1992 Winter Olympics
Ice hockey people from Toronto
Italian ice hockey coaches
Italian expatriate sportspeople in China
Canadian expatriate sportspeople in China
Canadian ice hockey coaches
Canadian sportspeople of Italian descent
Canadian expatriate sportspeople in Russia
Canadian expatriate sportspeople in Switzerland
Canadian expatriate sportspeople in the Czech Republic
Italian expatriate sportspeople in Russia
Italian expatriate sportspeople in the Czech Republic
Italian expatriate sportspeople in Switzerland
Ice hockey coaches at the 2022 Winter Olympics
National ice hockey team coaches
Italian expatriate sportspeople in Croatia
Canadian expatriate sportspeople in Croatia